Kumarun is a village in Bhatar CD block in Bardhaman Sadar North subdivision of Purba Bardhaman district in the state of West Bengal, India.

History
Census 2011 Kumarun Village Location Code or Village Code 3197864. The village of Kumarun is located in the Bhatar tehsil of Burdwan district in West Bengal, India.

Demographics
The total geographic area of village is 253.62  hectares. Kumarun features a total population of 931 peoples. There are about 217 houses in Kumarun village. Ratanpur is nearest Village to Kumarun which is approximately 2 km away.

Population and house data

Transport 

Healthcare
Nearest Rural Hospital at Bhatar (with 60 beds) is the main medical facility in Bhatar CD block. There are primary health centres

External links
 Map
 Ratanpur

References 

Villages in Purba Bardhaman district